Khambhlav is a village and former minor princely state on Saurashtra peninsula in Gujarat, western India.

The village is in Limbdi Taluka, in Surendranagar District.

History 
The non-salute princely state in Jhalawar prant was ruled by Jhala Rajput Chieftains. It comprised two villages.

In 1901 it has a population of 852, yielding a state revenue of 1,500 (mostly from land), paying an 869 Rupees tribute to the British and Junagadh State.

External links 
 Imperial Gazetteer on dsal.uchicago.edu - Kathiawar

Princely states of Gujarat
Rajput princely states